Patrick Joseph Wilson (born July 3, 1973) is an American actor who is best known for playing the role of demonologist Ed Warren in the Conjuring Universe (2013–present). 
He began his career in 1995, starring in Broadway musicals. He is a two-time Tony Award nominee for his roles in The Full Monty (2000–2001) and Oklahoma! (2002). He co-starred in the acclaimed HBO miniseries Angels in America (2003), which he was nominated for both the Golden Globe Award and Primetime Emmy Award for Outstanding Supporting Actor in a Miniseries or a Movie.

Wilson has also appeared in films such as The Phantom of the Opera (2004), Hard Candy (2005), Little Children (2006), Watchmen (2009), Insidious (2010), The A-Team (2010), Insidious: Chapter 2 (2013), and as demonologist Ed Warren in the Conjuring Universe (2013–present). He has earned a reputation as a "scream king" due to his frequent casting in horror films.

On television, Wilson starred in the CBS drama series A Gifted Man (2011–2012) and as Lou Solverson in the second season of FX's anthology series Fargo (2015), for which he received a second Golden Globe Award nomination. In the DC Extended Universe, he voiced the U.S. President in Batman v Superman: Dawn of Justice (2016), and later portrayed Orm Marius / Ocean Master in Aquaman (2018), a role which he is set to reprise in Aquaman and the Lost Kingdom (2023).

Early life
Patrick Joseph Wilson was born in Norfolk, Virginia, on July 3, 1973, the son of voice teacher and singer Mary Kay Wilson and WTVT news anchor John Franklin Wilson. He has two older brothers: Paul, an advertising executive, and Mark, who succeeded their father as a WTVT news anchor. Wilson grew up in St. Petersburg, Florida, where he attended Shorecrest Preparatory School. In 1995, he graduated with a BFA in Drama from Carnegie Mellon University.

Career

In 1995, Wilson made his acting debut as an understudy in the role of Chris Scott in the national touring production of Miss Saigon. The following year, he portrayed Billy Bigelow in the national tour of Carousel. In 1999, he starred as Jamie Conway in the off-Broadway production of Bright Lights, Big City, and Wilson later made his Broadway theatre debut in The Full Monty (2000), portraying Jerry Lukowski. For his performance in the role, he was nominated for the Tony Award for Best Actor in a Musical and the Drama Desk Award for Outstanding Actor in a Musical.

Circa 2000, Wilson completed work on the film My Sister's Wedding, which has never been released. He sang "On the Street Where You Live" from My Fair Lady for Julie Andrews' awards ceremony when she received the Kennedy Center Honors in 2001. In 2002, his performance as Curly McLain in the Broadway production of Oklahoma! received critical acclaim, with Wilson being nominated for the Tony Award for Best Actor in a Musical and the Drama Desk Award for Outstanding Actor in a Musical for the second time each. He won critical acclaim for his performance as the closeted Mormon Republican Joe Pitt in Mike Nichols' 2003 HBO drama miniseries Angels in America, receiving nominations for both the Golden Globe Award for Best Supporting Actor – Series, Miniseries or Television Film and the Primetime Emmy Award for Outstanding Supporting Actor in a Miniseries or a Movie.

In 2004, Wilson made his first film appearance in The Alamo, playing William B. Travis. That same year, he co-starred in the musical film The Phantom of the Opera as Viscount Raoul de Chagny. The following year, he starred alongside Elliot Page in the psychological thriller film Hard Candy, portraying a pedophile named Jeff Kohlver.

In 2006, Wilson starred as Brad Adamson in Todd Field's Little Children. Also in 2006, he appeared in the Golden Globe Award-nominated Running with Scissors as Michael Shephard, which was directed by Ryan Murphy and produced by Brad Pitt. In 2007, he starred as Brian Callahan in the independent film Purple Violets, which was written and directed by Edward Burns. In 2008, he starred in Neil LaBute's Lakeview Terrace.

Wilson played Dan Dreiberg / Nite Owl II in Zack Snyder's 2009 film adaptation of the graphic novel Watchmen, gaining 25 pounds for the role after filming flashback scenes as the slimmer Nite Owl II. This film reunited Wilson with his Little Children co-star, Jackie Earle Haley. On October 19, 2010, in Yankee Stadium, he sang "God Bless America" during the seventh-inning stretch of Game 4 of the American League Championship Series between the Texas Rangers and the New York Yankees. On November 20, 2010, in Yankee Stadium, he sang the United States National Anthem before the first football game in the new stadium, played between Army and Notre Dame.

Wilson played the primary antagonist Lynch in 2010's The A-Team, and co-starred with Rose Byrne in James Wan's horror film Insidious. He returned for the latter film's sequel, Insidious: Chapter 2, which was released in 2013. In 2013, Wilson portrayed the famous paranormal investigator Ed Warren, alongside Vera Farmiga starring as his wife Lorraine, in the horror film The Conjuring. The film was critically acclaimed, becoming one of the highest grossing horror films of all time. Wilson reprised the role in the film's sequel, The Conjuring 2, released on June 10, 2016.

In January 2014, Wilson was announced to portray the lead role, Lou Solverson, in the second season of FX's anthology series Fargo. He was nominated for the 2015 Golden Globe Award for Best Actor – Miniseries or Television Film for his performance. In March 2014, Wilson was cast in an unspecified role in the Marvel Cinematic Universe film Ant-Man, but later left the film due to scheduling conflicts brought upon by multiple delays with the film's production. That same year, he was cast as Arthur O'Dwyer in the Western film Bone Tomahawk, opposite Kurt Russell and Matthew Fox.

In 2016, he co-starred in John Lee Hancock's biopic The Founder, as Rollie Smith, based on the life of McDonald's fast food restaurants' founder Ray Kroc. In August 2016, Barbra Streisand released the album Encore: Movie Partners Sing Broadway, on which she and Wilson duet the song "Loving You" from the Stephen Sondheim musical Passion.

In 2018, Wilson co-starred in Jaume Collet-Serra's action thriller The Commuter, reuniting with The Conjuring co-star Farmiga, and portraying a trusted friend of Liam Neeson's character. Also that year, he portrayed Orm Marius / Ocean Master in the DC Extended Universe film Aquaman, directed by long-time collaborator James Wan, and is set to reprise his role in Aquaman and the Lost Kingdom.

On November 8, 2019, Roland Emmerich's blockbuster film Midway, was released, starring Wilson along with Ed Skrein, Mandy Moore, Luke Evans, Aaron Eckhart, Nick Jonas, Dennis Quaid and Woody Harrelson. In June 2020, Wilson signed on to Emmerich's Moonfall. Production began in October 2020 and is slated for a 2022 release.

In his directorial debut, Wilson will helm the upcoming Insidious: Fear the Dark. Announced in October 2020, the film will serve as a direct sequel to Insidious: Chapter 2 with both Wilson and Ty Simpkins reprising their roles. Scott Teems wrote the script based on a story by Leigh Whannell. Whannell, James Wan, Jason Blum, and Oren Peli will produce the film.

Charity work
In May 2012, the band VanWilson (consisting of Wilson on vocals and drums and his brothers on guitar and vocals) performed a benefit concert for Southeastern Guide Dogs' Paws For Patriots program in St. Petersburg, Florida. They raised $30,000 for the program and were honored by the organization by having puppies named after them. The brothers have also performed benefit concerts for All Children's Hospital and the St. Petersburg Free Clinic.

Personal life
Wilson married Polish-American actress Dagmara Domińczyk in 2005. They have two sons, born in 2006 and 2009, and reside in Montclair, New Jersey. His sister-in-law is actress Marika Domińczyk, who is married to actor and director Scott Foley.

In April 2012, Wilson gave the keynote address for his alma mater, Carnegie Mellon University, in which he spoke of his memories from childhood and through his career.

Filmography

Film

Television

Video games

Stage

Audio work

Cast recordings
 Allegro (2009; studio cast recording)
 Bright Lights, Big City (2005; studio cast recording)
 The Full Monty (2001; original Broadway cast recording)
 Dreamgirls in Concert (as film executive; 2001 concert cast recording)
 Tenderloin (2000; Encores! concert cast recording)
 Lucky in the Rain (2000; studio cast recording)
 Terrence Mann's Romeo & Juliet: The Musical from William Shakespeare (1999)
 Brigadoon (2017; New York City Center cast recording)

Soundtracks
 The Phantom of the Opera (2004)

Audiobooks
 The Garden of Eden by Ernest Hemingway (2006) (Simon & Schuster)
 The Ruins by Scott Smith (2006) (Simon & Schuster)

Miscellaneous
 Every Day Is a Holiday (2009 Christmas album) by Mary McBride
 Lucky (2004 CD) by Gary Kline
 Broadway Cares: Home for the Holidays (2001 CD)
 The Dreams in You (2001 CD)
 Encore: Movie Partners Sing Broadway (2016 CD) by Barbra Streisand

References

External links

 
 
 

1973 births
Living people
20th-century American male actors
21st-century American male actors
American male film actors
American male stage actors
American male musical theatre actors
American male television actors
American male voice actors
Carnegie Mellon University College of Fine Arts alumni
Male actors from Florida
Male actors from Tampa, Florida
Male actors from Virginia
Musicians from St. Petersburg, Florida
Actors from Norfolk, Virginia
Musicians from Norfolk, Virginia
Actors from Virginia